The Intermediate Geographic Region of Barbacena (code 3107) is one of the 13 intermediate geographic regions in the Brazilian state of Minas Gerais and one of the 134 of Brazil, created by the National Institute of Geography and Statistics (IBGE) in 2017.

It comprises 49 municipalities, distributed in 3 immediate geographic regions:

 Immediate Geographic Region of Barbacena.
 Immediate Geographic Region of Conselheiro Lafaiete.
 Immediate Geographic Region of São João del-Rei.

Statistics 
 Population, estimation (IBGE), on July 1, 2018: 772 764 persons.
 Area: 15 259.188 km².
 Population density: 50.64 persons/km².

References 

Geography of Minas Gerais